Gamze Özçelik (born 26 August 1982) is a Turkish actress, model and TV hostess. She is best known for hit crime series "Arka Sokaklar" which played with ex husband Uğur Pektaş. Arka Sokaklar is the longest Turkish series. She played in series "Serseri" with ex-boyfriend Okan Yalabık. Her other popular series are series "Tatlı Hayat" Turkish remake of The Jeffersons, "Canan" and historical series "Mehmetçik Kut'ül Amare". She played with veteran actor Haluk Bilginer for third time.

Biography
Her maternal is of Turkish origin who immigrated from Thessaloniki, Ottoman Empire (now in Greece). She studied at Maltepe Anatolian High School, and went on to graduate from Istanbul Bilgi University. She won the Elite Model look 1999. After this she ventured into acting.
Gamze was also a co-host of the Turkish version of Popstars, Popstar 1 and afterwards Pop Idol, Türkstar.

Filmography

Series

Cinema
Hırsız Var! (2004)

References

External links 

1982 births
Models from Istanbul
Living people
Turkish film actresses
Turkish female models
20th-century Turkish actresses
Istanbul Bilgi University alumni
Turkish television actresses
Television people from Istanbul